Hannah McLean (born 1 July 1981 in London, England) is a New Zealand swimming competitor. She won a bronze medal in the 200 m backstroke at the 2006 Commonwealth Games.

She also competed at the 2004 Olympic Games.

References

1981 births
Living people
New Zealand female swimmers
Olympic swimmers of New Zealand
Commonwealth Games bronze medallists for New Zealand
Swimmers at the 2004 Summer Olympics
Swimmers at the 2006 Commonwealth Games
Medalists at the FINA World Swimming Championships (25 m)
Commonwealth Games medallists in swimming
Medallists at the 2006 Commonwealth Games